Graeme Thomas Miro Bachop (born 11 June 1967) is a former rugby union footballer from New Zealand. He is of Samoan, Tahitian and Cook Islands heritage.

Career
Bachop made his All Blacks debut against Japan B in Tokyo on 21 October 1987, his first international debut was against  on 4 November 1989.

He played at the 1991 and 1995 Rugby World Cup.

All Blacks statistics
Tests: 31 (0 as Captain)
Games: 23 (0 as Captain)
Total Matches: 54 (0 as Captain)
Test Points: 18pts (4t, 0c, 0p, 0dg, 0m)
Game Points: 61pts (15t, 0c, 0p, 0dg, 0m)
Total Points: 79pts (19t, 0c, 0p, 0dg, 0m)

See also
High School Old Boys RFC

References

External links

1967 births
Japanese rugby union players
New Zealand sportspeople of Cook Island descent
New Zealand people of French Polynesian descent
New Zealand sportspeople of Samoan descent
Japan international rugby union players
New Zealand international rugby union players
Canterbury rugby union players
Rugby union scrum-halves
New Zealand expatriate rugby union players
Expatriate rugby union players in Japan
New Zealand expatriate sportspeople in Japan
Rugby union players from Christchurch
Living people
Bachop-Mauger family